Cameron Morrell Douglas (born December 13, 1978) is an American actor.

Early life and family 
Douglas  is the elder son of actor Michael Douglas and Diandra Morrell Douglas (née Luker), and grandson of actor Kirk Douglas and Bermudan actress Diana Dill. His parents divorced in 1995.

Through his father's second marriage to Catherine Zeta-Jones, Douglas has two paternal half-siblings.

Career
He has appeared in four films: Jackie Chan's Mr. Nice Guy (1997), It Runs in the Family (2003), National Lampoon's Adam & Eve (2005) and Loaded (2008).  In It Runs in the Family he appeared together with his father, Michael Douglas, grandfather, Kirk Douglas, and grandmother, Diana Dill.

Legal troubles

Drug dealing and conviction
Douglas has been arrested for drug offenses at least three times. In 1999, he was found with cocaine in Manhattan and was arrested and charged with a misdemeanor possession of a controlled substance. The charge was dropped after he pleaded guilty to the lesser charge of disorderly conduct. In 2007, he was charged with felony possession of a controlled substance after police officers found a syringe with liquid cocaine in a car he was in. Due to the large amount of the drug seized, Douglas was charged with intent to distribute. The charge carries a minimum prison sentence of 10 years and a maximum of life.

On January 27, 2010, Douglas pleaded guilty to conspiracy to distribute drugs and heroin possession after his girlfriend had smuggled heroin hidden inside an electric toothbrush and passed it on to him while he was under house arrest. On April 20, 2010, Douglas was sentenced to five years in prison for possessing heroin and dealing large amounts of methamphetamine and cocaine out of a New York hotel room. Michael Douglas publicly assumed blame for "being a bad father" but said that without prison intervention, Cameron "was going to be dead or somebody was gonna kill him. I think he has a chance to start a new life, and he knows that."

In October 2011, Douglas pleaded guilty to possessing drugs in prison. On December 21, 2011, he was sentenced to an additional 4 years in prison for this charge.  In December 2012, his leg was broken by another inmate. In January 2013, Douglas was again found to have drugs in his system while in prison in Loretto, Pennsylvania. He failed a urinalysis and was sent to segregated housing. On April 15, 2013, his extended prison sentence was affirmed by the Second U.S. Circuit Court of Appeals. The Supreme Court denied his final appeal on January 13, 2014.

Release from prison
On August 1, 2016, Douglas was released early from prison and transferred to a halfway house in New York City after seven years behind bars, with two of the seven years in segregated housing.

Personal life
His book, Long Way Home, is about his experiences after being convicted on drug charges. He has set up an account on Instagram, where his first post was an image of the phrase "Be the energy you want to attract."

Douglas is in a longtime relationship with Viviane Thibes. The couple have two children, a daughter named Lua Izzy (born 2017) and a son named Ryder (born 2020).

Filmography

References

External links

 

1978 births
Living people
20th-century American male actors
21st-century American male actors
American male film actors
American drug traffickers
Dill family
American prisoners and detainees
Douglas family
American people of Belarusian-Jewish descent
American people of Belgian descent
American people of Bermudian descent
Male actors from Santa Barbara, California
Place of birth missing (living people)
Prisoners and detainees of New York (state)